Vietnam National University may refer to:

 Vietnam National University, Hanoi
 Vietnam National University, Ho Chi Minh City